Obscura may refer to:

Arts, entertainment, and media
 Obscura (album), the third album by Gorguts
 Obscura (band), a German death metal band
 "Obscura" (Smallville episode) from season 1
 Obscura Antiques & Oddities, the antique store in the TV show Oddities
 Obscura engravings and paintings, elements in the video game Tomb Raider: The Angel of Darkness

Biology
 Obscura (moth), a synonym of the moth genus Obscurior

Other uses
 ObscurA, an online crypt hunt organised by NIT Kurukshetra
 Obscura Digital, a creative technology company

See also
 Camera obscura
 Obscuranella
 Obscurantism
 Obscurior